Jatni  (or Khurda Road, name of the railway station) is a town and a major sub-urban area of Bhubaneswar, the state capital of Odisha. It is also a municipality in Khordha district in the Indian state of Odisha.
Jatni, also known as Khurda Road Junction in Indian Railways parlance, acts as an important railway junction between the main railroads running between Kolkata and Chennai, with diversions to the Hindu pilgrimage city of Puri, and to Balangir, passing through the districts of Nayagad, Daspalla, Phulbani, Boudh and Sonepur the vast tribal hinterland of Odisha.
It has emerged as a commercial hub with a number of educational and other institutions. It is home to Premier Public Institutes like NISER and IIT-Bhubaneswar and ICAR- International Centre for Foot and Mouth Disease (ICFMD). Jatni is famous for its celebration of the festival of Ganesh Chaturthi.

Geography
It has an average elevation of 36 metres (118 feet).

Demographics
 India census, Jatani had a population of 63,697.  Males constitute 52% of the population and females 48%. Jatani has an average literacy rate of 78%, higher than the national average of 59.5%: male literacy is 83%, and female literacy is 72%.  In Jatani, 11% of the population is under 6 years of age.
Its surrounding villages are Bachhara, Khudupur, Uparabasta, Sandhapur, Gobindpur, Gopinathpur, Kusumati, Kudiary.

Culture

The majority of population in Jatani are Odia.  Others like Malayali, Telugu, Marwari, Gujarati, Bengali, Bihari etc. are also present in good numbers. It is also the home to the highest number of Anglo-Indian people in Odisha. A variety of communities live here because Jatani has been a very important railway station since the British rule. A major chunk of people living here are railway employees.

Jatani is famous for its celebration of the Ganesh Chaturthi festival. Jatani is very  crowded during Ganesh Puja as people from nearby places visit in huge numbers for the occasion. This celebration continues for about a fortnight. People of Jatani maintain communal harmony. Eid ul-Fitr & Christmas Day are also celebrated with religious fervor.

Diwali and Holi are celebrated here with much fanfare. The firework shops in Jatani draw a large number of buyers from nearby places like Bhubaneswar, Khurda, Puri etc. These fireworks are manufactured in nearby villages like Padanpur. Apart from being sold in huge quantities in the makeshift shops during Diwali, these fireworks are also sold throughout the year in wholesale shops, mainly supplementing to the fanfare of marriage processions.

Several communities residing in Jatani keep alive their own traditions, be it the Anglo-Indians celebrating Christmas in the open or the Marwari's Garba in closely guarded community atmosphere or the Muslims carrying out Mourning of Muharram and Julus during Miladun Nabi.

Several week-long festivals for the goddess Bhagabati Devi are also celebrated mostly in Railway settlement areas esp. Loco Colony and Retang colony. On the last day, the procession is carried out in public, followed by a carnival depicting stories from Hindu mythologies like Ramayana, Mahabharat etc.

The town is spread across various Railways settlements akin colonies like Traffic Colony, New colony, Accounts Colony, Retang Colony, Loco Colony surrounded by private townships like Gajapati Nagar, Madhusudhan Nagar, Nuagaun, Hata Bazaar, Raja Bazaar, Bali Chhaka Sahi, Mundia Sahi, Railway Market, Kudiary, Sitaram Chhaka, Thaana Chhaka, Bacharapatna, Rathipur, Kusumati ( is the local equivalent for cross, similarly  is the local equivalent for market).

Temples

There are some good and old temples in and around Jatani. Among the old temples is the Budhapada Somanath Temple (dedicated to Lord Shiva). Devotees from different places in and around Jatani visit this temple. Other temples are Chotta Somnath Temple situated at Kudiary, Venkateswara Temple, Maa Damunei Temple (Uttarayani Temple), Maa Mangala Temple, Vishnu Temple (Shreehari Vihar), Taleshwar Temple (Lord Shiva) situated at Barapada, and Jatiani temple (the deity from whom Jatni gets its name).

Dola Jatra is celebrated in Harirajpur (4 km away from Jatni town), which takes place on the 5th day following Dolo Purnima. People visit and offer their prayers to Gods by applying different colours of Holi. Ganesh Puja is the biggest festival of Jatni in which more than 300,000 people come during the festival to watch the pandals and enjoy the evening in Meena Bazaar with games and end their day with watching Odia operas known as Jatra party. The most important historical place near Jatani is Barunei Hills. During the British times, the  started the freedom movement from here.

Transport

It has excellent railway connectivity with most major cities in the country. Jatani Railway Station is known as Khurda Road Junction and is the biggest Railway Junction of the East Coast for the Indian Railways in the state. Trains from different parts of the country are routed to different cities from the Chennai-Kolkata main line.

Road
It is well connected to all other cities in the state. The NH-16 National Highway (connecting Chennai & Kolkata) runs close to Jatani (around 7 km). The state capital, Bhubaneswar, is located at a distance of 22 km. Khurda is located at a distance of 8 km. Pipili is located at distance of 13 km. Mo bus has started in the area between the Khurda road railway station and bhubaneswar Master canteen recently. Mo cyles have been planed.

Rail
Khurda Road Junction railway station is in Jatani. It is a major junction of Indian Railways. It is well connected to other cities like Bhubaneswar (19 km), Puri (44 km), Kolkata (456 km), Mumbai (1913 km), New Delhi (1819 km), Chennai (1204 km), Hyderabad (1124 km), Bangalore (1606 km), Ahmedabad (2000 km), Pune (1721 km) etc. by rail. Khurda Road Junction is one of the three divisions of East Coast Railway Zone (ECoR) of the Indian Railways ( Sambalpur, and Waltair are the other two ), and is an important railway junction which has diversions to Puri and Bolangir, in addition to the Howrah-Chennai main line connecting south India. The connecting tracks to Bolangir is currently semi-operational with trains operating between Khurda Road and Nayagarh.

Air
The nearest Airport is Biju Patnaik International Airport, at Bhubaneswar, which is 25 km away.

Medical
Jatani Municipal Hospital - It is an old hospital run by the Odisha Government that provides necessary healthcare services to the populace of local and neighboring areas. It operates for about 8 hours in a day. It has experienced doctors and pharmacists, who are very dedicated towards their work.

Railway Hospital - This hospital is set up for the Railway employees only. Employees from areas around Jatani and neighboring towns and villages also avail of the facilities provided by this hospital.

Chandan Clinical Lab - One of the oldest pathological clinic in Jatani providing round-the-clock  home visit facility.

Tata Memorial Centre (TMC) Cancer Hospital:  for cancer patients and research at National Institute of Science Education and Research (NISER).

Education

Premier Public Higher Education Institutes
National Institute of Science Education and Research (NISER) 
Indian Institute of Technology, Bhubaneswar

Private Engineering Colleges
Centurion University of Technology & Management
Konark Institute of Science and Technology
Orissa Engineering College (OEC)

General Colleges
Baba Residential College
Jatni College.
Sarat Paikaray Mahabidyalaya.

Schools

A.D.S public school - affiliated to the I.C.S.E., situated opposite the Tehsildar Office Jatni.
Aditya Birla Public School, Jatani - school of Aditya Birla Group. It is beside the Xub.
Bethel Chapel Mission School - affiliated to the I.C.S.E. board, also popularly known as Mission school.
DAV public school, jatni- popularly known as Dav-jatni, it has secondary level education system.it is situated near centurion college jatni.
Kendriya Vidyalaya - Popularly known as KV-KUR, it has both Secondary and Senior Secondary level education system.
Kudiary High School - It is an Odia-medium (Odisha State Board) school situated in Kudiary.
NDRC High School - an Odia-medium school situated in Retang Colony and affiliated to the Odisha State Board.
Prananath (P.N.) High School - The oldest school in the town,  an Odia-medium school affiliated to the Odisha State Board. Situated near Jatni College. 
Railway School - A State Board school run by the East Coast Railways. Teaching is mainly  in English. It is situated near the Railway Hospital in Traffic Colony.
Saraswati Shishu Vidya Mandir, Jatani - a Vidya Bharati school 
S.D.P Bidyapitha High School - It is an Odia-medium (Odisha State Board) school situated near Bachharapatna.
St. Xaviers High School -  affiliated to the C.B.S.E., situated opposite Jatni Medical (Govt.).
Utkal Public School formerly SERWO (South Eastern Railway Women's  Organisation) School - affiliated to C.B.S.E  also popularly known as SERWO ENG. MED SCHOOL, Jatni
Other schools include:- St. Xavier High School,  Swosti Jy oti Vidya Mandir, Girls high school, Boys high school, Cristal valley school, Konark Public School,

Politics
Current MLA from Jatni Assembly Constituency is Sura Routray of INC from May 2019, successor to Bhagirathi Badajena, who won the seat in State elections of 2014. Earlier Sarat Paikary won in 1990 as JD candidate and 2004 as Biju Janta Dal candidate. Winner of this seat in 2000, 1995, 1985, 1980 and 1977 was Suresh Kumar Routray, who represented INC in 2000, 1995 and 1985, represented INC(I) in 1980 and JNP in 1977.

Jatni is part of Bhubaneswar (Lok Sabha constituency).

Photo gallery

References

Cities and towns in Khordha district